The Brother Speed Motorcycle Club is an American outlaw motorcycle club that was formed in Boise, Idaho in 1969, and is active in Idaho and Oregon. It once was referred to by the Oregon Department of Justice as one of the nine "motorcycle clubs" active in their state.

Organization 
There are thought to be 200–300 Brother Speed members with chapters in Oregon and Idaho.

History 
Brother Speed was established by a group of high school friends who enjoyed riding together. The friends noticed an increase in motorcycles in the area and decided to run a newspaper ad looking for anyone interested in starting a club. A meeting was organized with approximately 20 people attending. A few weeks after the first meeting, the group came up with the name, "Brother Speed." The club's center patch is a winged skull with a cap, goggles, and scarf. Brother Speed's "colors" are black and gold.

During the 1970s, the Brother Speed in Boise applied to the Oakland, California chapter of the Hells Angels for permission to join the Angels. The Oakland club sent a representative to Idaho to assess the Brother Speed's suitability for membership, who recommended that the Brothers not be accepted into the Hells Angels. The reason why the Brother Speed was denied membership in the Hells Angels is unknown.

The Brother Speed has allegedly associated with the Hells Angels, the Outsiders, and the Devils Breed in order to acquire precursor chemicals used in the manufacture of methamphetamine. The Brother Speed chapter in Reno, Nevada, in collusion with the Hells Angels' Sacramento, California chapter and California Nomads chapter, has reportedly used twin-engine airplanes to transport drugs between northern California and Nevada. The Brothers Speed in Idaho have allegedly been involved in sending methamphetamine, sealed inside the frames of motorcycles, to the Rebels in Sydney, Australia.

Fearing that their operations would be taken over by the Hells Angels, the Brother Speed strengthened by beginning an alliance with the Bandidos of Texas in the early 1990s. The club has purchased illegal weapons from members of the Aryan Nations in northern Idaho. Brother Speed members have also assembled fully-automatic stun guns after ordering parts.

In 2006, a member was sentenced to 21 years for distributing methamphetamine and lying about it in court. In 2005, federal and local officers raided the then Brother Speed clubhouse where it was believed many of the meth transactions had occurred. It was believed that the member was a major leader in a large meth trafficking ring.

On 19 September 2009, up to 26 motorcycles ridden by members of the Brother Speed motorcycle club were involved in a motorcycle crash on Interstate 5 near Wilsonville, Oregon. The crash inflicted serious injuries on two of the bikers, sent ten to the hospital, and closed off that portion of I-5 for four hours. One of the critically injured Brother Speed members improved and was released from the hospital; the other died as a result of injuries sustained in the crash.

In April 2012, two members of Brother Speed were arrested on suspicion of harassment, menacing, reckless driving and recklessly endangering another person. After chasing a car in Eugene, Oregon, they were reportedly hitting the car with their hands and a metal hook attached to a leather leash.
In May 2012, five of the Idaho Falls members of Brother Speed, attacked two members of Pocatello's Empties motorcycle club at a gathering for child who was suffering from cancer, nearly 400 bikers having gathered that Saturday to grant Johnson's wish to participate in a motorcycle rally.

See also
 List of outlaw motorcycle clubs

References

External links
 

Organizations established in 1969
1969 establishments in Idaho
Organizations based in Boise, Idaho
Outlaw motorcycle clubs
Motorcycle clubs in the United States